Kipkosgei, also written Kipkosgey and Kipkoskei, is a surname of Kenyan origin" Arap Kosgei means son Of Kipkosgei. Kipkosgei is not similar with Kipkogei it may refer to:

Daniel Kipkosgei (born 1986), Kenyan long-distance track runner competing for Qatar as Essa Ismail Rashed
Hellen Kimaiyo Kipkoskei (born 1968), Kenyan long-distance runner and two-time African champion
Luke Kipkosgei (born 1975), Kenyan long-distance runner and world indoor medallist
Paul Kipkosgei Kemboi (born 1990), Kenyan long-distance track runner competing for Turkey as Polat Kemboi Arıkan

See also
Kosgei, origin of Kipkosgei
Jepkosgei, name meaning "daughter of Kosgei"

Kalenjin names